Salvador Vives may refer to:

 Salvador de Vives, mayor of Ponce, Puerto Rico
 Salvador Vives Gómez, actor from Barcelona